Antefungivoridae is an extinct family of fungus gnats and gall midges in the order Diptera. There are about 9 genera and more than 40 described species in Antefungivoridae.

Genera
These nine genera belong to the family Antefungivoridae:
 † Antefungivora Rohdendorf, 1938
 † Antiquamedia Rohdendorf, 1938
 † Aortomima Zhang, Zhang, Liu & Shangguan, 1986
 † Baishuilingella Lin, 1980
 † Lycoriomimodes Rohdendorf, 1946
 † Mimallactoneura Rohdendorf, 1946
 † Paralycoriomima Rohdendorf, 1946
 † Pleciomima Rohdendorf, 1938
 † Sciaromima Kovalev, 1990

References

Nematocera
†Antefungivoridae
Prehistoric insect families
Taxa named by Boris Rohdendorf